Napavine is a city in Lewis County, Washington, United States. The population was 1,766 at the 2020 census.

History
Napavine was officially incorporated as a town on November 21, 1913. Settlers began arriving in the Cowlitz area in the early 1850s. In 1883, Scottish immigrant James Urquhart laid out the town naming it Napavine from the Indian word "Napavoon" meaning "small prairie".

Economy
Napavine primarily serves as a bedroom community for the Centralia/Chehalis and Olympia areas.

Geography
Napavine is located at  (46.579284, -122.910935).

The large hill that Napavine is sitting on is about 400 feet above sea level.

Demographics

2010 census
As of the census of 2010, there were 1,988 people, 609 households, and 770 families living in the city. The racial makeup of the city was 97.0% White, 0.2% African American, 0.7% Native American, 0.8% Asian, 0.1% Pacific Islander, 2.1% from other races, and 5.2% from two or more races. Hispanic or Latino of any race were 1.0% of the population.

There were 609 households, of which 63.0% had children under the age of 18 living with them, 67.0% were married couples living together, 13.8% had a female householder with no husband present, 6.4% had a male householder with no wife present, and 22.8% were non-families. 19.0% of all households were made up of individuals, and 8% had someone living alone who was 65 years of age or older. The average household size was 5.90 and the average family size was 5.29.

The median age in the city was 32.9 years. 30.8% of residents were under the age of 18; 8.6% were between the ages of 18 and 24; 26.5% were from 25 to 44; 22.3% were from 45 to 64; and 11.7% were 65 years of age or older. The gender makeup of the city was 48.6% male and 51.4% female.

2000 census
As of the census of 2000, there were 1,361 people, 444 households, and 349 families living in the city. The population density was 1,702.5 people per square mile (656.9/km2). There were 474 housing units at an average density of 592.9 per square mile (228.8/km2). The racial makeup of the city was 93.02% White, 0.15% African American, 1.54% Native American, 0.15% Asian, 0.29% Pacific Islander, 3.31% from other races, and 1.54% from two or more races. Hispanic or Latino of any race were 5.73% of the population.

There were 444 households, out of which 47.7% had children under the age of 18 living with them, 57.2% were married couples living together, 16.2% had a female householder with no husband present, and 21.2% were non-families. 16.4% of all households were made up of individuals, and 6.1% had someone living alone who was 65 years of age or older. The average household size was 3.05 and the average family size was 3.45.

In the city, the population was spread out, with 37.0% under the age of 18, 7.0% from 18 to 24, 30.3% from 25 to 44, 17.0% from 45 to 64, and 8.7% who were 65 years of age or older. The median age was 29 years. For every 100 females, there were 94.4 males. For every 100 females age 18 and over, there were 91.7 males.

The median income for a household in the city was $40,966, and the median income for a family was $41,250. Males had a median income of $38,750 versus $26,103 for females. The per capita income for the city was $16,275. About 12.7% of families and 13.0% of the population were below the poverty line, including 15.8% of those under age 18 and 11.0% of those age 65 or over.

Politics
Napavine is among the most Republican cities in western Washington.

The results for the 2020 U.S. Presidential Election for all Napavine voting districts were as follows:

 Donald J. Trump (Republican) - 670 (68.93%)
 Joe Biden (Democrat) - 274 (28.19%)
 Jo Jorgensen (Libertarian) - 20 (2.06%)
 Other candidates - 3 (0.31%)
 Write-in candidate - 5 (0.51%)

In January 2008, 22 year-old Nick Bozarth became the youngest mayor in the history of Napavine. Bozarth banned city workers from taking extended lunch breaks and removed a controversial police chief. Bozarth intended to be a one-term mayor, and chose not to run for re-election, citing that public servants should not be long term office holders.

Schools
Napavine School District operates the public schools in the city of Napavine. Its high school, Napavine High School, has a 2B/1A athletics classification and plays in the Washington Interscholastic Activities Association (WIAA) Southwest Washington District 4. Napavine also is home to the Napavine Christian Academy owned by the Baptist church.

References

Cities in Washington (state)
Cities in Lewis County, Washington
1913 establishments in Washington (state)